Harry Newsome (born January 25, 1963) is a former professional American football player who played punter for nine seasons for the Pittsburgh Steelers and Minnesota Vikings. Harry holds the record for the longest punt in Three Rivers Stadium of 84 yards. He shares with Herman Weaver the NFL record for most of his own punts blocked in a career with 14. In 1988, he set the NFL record for most of his own punts blocked in a season with 6.

Today, Newsome lives in his hometown, Cheraw, SC with his wife, Beth. Together, they have three children: Josh, Laurin, and Cody. After retirement, Newsome founded his own landscaping company.

References 

1963 births
Living people
People from Cheraw, South Carolina
American football punters
Wake Forest Demon Deacons football players
Pittsburgh Steelers players
Minnesota Vikings players